Éric Antoine (born 23 September 1976) is a French comedy magician, theatre director, actor and television presenter. In 2006, he was a contestant on the first season of La France a un incroyable talent on M6. Antoine has been one of the show's judges since 2015. He presented the French version of All Together Now in 2019. He has been the presenter of the French version of Lego Masters since 2020 and Show Me Your Voice since 2021. He has appeared in one episode of the French version of Top Chef in 2018 and has been a contestant on Fort Boyard in 2020.

References

External links

 

1976 births
People from Enghien-les-Bains
French television presenters
French magicians
French theatre directors
French male comedians
French game show hosts
French humorists
Got Talent contestants
La France a un incroyable talent
Living people
21st-century French comedians